On November 5, 2002, Washington, D.C., held an election for its mayor, with incumbent Democratic mayor Anthony A. Williams easily defeating Carol Schwartz, the Republican nominee. Both the Democratic primary and the Republican primary elections were held on September 10, 2002. Williams not only won the Democratic primary but also received the most votes in the Republican primary. Because Washington, D.C. law prevents a candidate from being nominated by more than one party, Carol Schwartz was chosen as the Republican nominee by local party leaders.

Results

Democratic primary

Republican primary

D.C. Statehood Green primary

References

2002
Washington
mayor
Washington, D.C.